Assisi Catholic College is a P-12 College on the Gold Coast in Upper Coomera, Queensland. This college was established in 2005. In 2009, the college ran all year levels from Prep to Year 12 for the first time. The school operates under four distinct phases of learning - Early Years (Prep to Year 3), Junior Years (Years 4 - 6), Middle Years (Years 7 - 9) and Senior Years (Years 10 - 12).

Most of the buildings in the college are named after places in Italy, which were also of importance to St Francis of Assisi - Greccio, Gubbio, Bonaventure, Perugia, San Damiano, Orvietto, Cortona, La Verna and Chiara. The exceptions are that of Bertoldi and the Pope Francis centre, the former of which is named after the architecture firm of the same name which is responsible for all the designs and construction work of the buildings, and the latter is in reference to Pope Francis, serving as the spiritual centre of the College.

Patron saints are St Francis of Assisi and St Clare.

External links
 

Schools on the Gold Coast, Queensland
High schools in Queensland
Educational institutions established in 2005
Private schools in Queensland
2005 establishments in Australia